Jean-Adrien Mercier (1899–1995) was a French illustrator, poster artist, and advertising designer. Born in Angers, Mercier received his training at the Ecole des Beaux-Arts (School of Fine Arts) in Angers, and then transferred to the Ecole des Arts Décoratifs (National School of Decorative Arts) in Paris in 1921. He began his career in 1924 as a designer of publicity and cinema posters, a field in which he remained active throughout his life. Between 1925 and 1942 Mercier designed more than 120 cinema posters and also produced numerous commercial posters. Notably, he designed for the house of Cointreau because of connections through his mother, the granddaughter of the founder of the company and daughter of the creator of triple sec Cointreau. Mercier worked there for some forty years, eventually becoming the artistic director of the firm. At the end of the 1930s, Mercier began producing illustrations for children's books and fairy tales. His entrance into children's illustrations was aided from his creation of the "Salut Olympique" for the Vichy government in 1940. Mercier was hired by the Compagnie Generale Transatlantique in 1961 to paint the decoration for the children's playroom on the transatlantic ocean liner and also design the ship's menus.

Public collections 
 Paris, Bibliothèque nationale de France
 Paris, Bibliothèque du film
 Paris, Musée de la publicité
 Paris, Bibliothèque Forney
 Angers, Musée des beaux-arts
Angers, Archives municipales de la ville d’Angers et d’Angers Loire Métropole
Strasbourg, Bibliothèque Nationale Universitaire de Strasbourg

1899 births
1995 deaths
French illustrators
People from Angers
French poster artists